Roll of the Dice is a 1995 studio album by Texas-based blues rock band The Fabulous Thunderbirds, their second without Jimmie Vaughan.

Track listing
 "Roll of the Dice" (Kim Wilson, Danny Kortchmar)
 "Too Many Irons in the Fire" (Kortchmar, Stan Lynch)
 "How Do I Get You Back?" (Kortchmar, Tonio K)
 "Here Comes the Night" (Bert Berns)
 "Takin' It Too Easy" (Wilson, Rick Giles)
 "I Don't Wanna Be the One" (Wilson, Jerry Williams)
 "Mean Love" (Wilson, Kortchmar)
 "I Can't Win" (Wilson, Kortchmar, Steve Jordan)
 "Memory from Hell" (Giles, Chuck Jones)
 "Lookin' Forward to Lookin' Back" (Wilson, Giles, Jones)
 "Do as I Say" (Wilson, Jones)
 "Zip A Dee Do Dah" (Allie Wrubel, Ray Gilbert)

Personnel

Musicians
Kim Wilson – vocals, harmonica
David Grissom – guitar
Kid Ramos – guitar
Danny Kortchmar – rhythm guitar
Harvey Brooks – bass
Fran Christina – drums
Gene Taylor – keyboards
Steve Jordan – drums, percussion, bass
Leon Pendarvis – Hammond B3 organ
Ron Russell – organ
Babi Floyd – backing vocals

Technical
George Cowan – recording
Niko Bolas – mixing

References

External links
Official website

1995 albums
The Fabulous Thunderbirds albums
Albums produced by Danny Kortchmar
Private Music albums